Friedrich Wolfgang Martin Henze (6 October 1873 – 28 August 1956) was a German chemist.

Early life 
Martin Henze was born the son of the sculptor and university professor Robert Henze (1827-1906). Henze studied in Bern, Leipzig and Heidelberg.

Career 
He worked with Johannes Wislicenus at the University of Leipzig were he received his PhD in 1897. In 1902 he was working at the deutsche Zoologische Station Neapel Stazione Zoologica Naples Italy together with Anton Dohrn. During this time he published his discovery of a vanadium containing compound in ascidiaceans. He left Italy shortly before World War I but rejoined the Institute in Naples in 1919. He became head of the medical chemistry department of the University of Innsbruck in 1921. Because of his opposition to the Nazis he was forced to retire early in 1938. After World War II he left Europe to life in the United States. He joined California Institute of Technology in Pasadena and became a US citizen in 1952.

Family 
He married Claire Barbara Foley in 1906, with her he had two sons Carlo (1907) and Robert (1908).

Death 
Henze died in 1956.

References

1873 births
1956 deaths
20th-century German chemists
Emigrants from Nazi Germany to the United States
Expatriates from the German Empire in Italy